Andrew Luri is a Sudanese-Australian actor. He made his acting debut in the film Hearts and Bones (2019), for which he was nominated for an AACTA Award.

Life
Luri migrated from South Sudan to Australia on a humanitarian visa in 2003.

Filmography

Film

Awards and nominations

References

External links
 

Living people
Australian male film actors
21st-century Australian male actors
South Sudanese emigrants to Australia
Year of birth missing (living people)